is a headland on the northerneastern point of the island of Honshu in Japan. It is located within the borders of the town of Higashidōri, Aomori in northern Shimokita Peninsula, and is part of the Shimokita Hantō Quasi-National Park. The cape is on the border of Tsugaru Strait separating Honshu from Hokkaido, and the Pacific Ocean.

Shiriyazaki Lighthouse is located on Cape Shiriya.

See also
Hamashiriya Shell Mound

External links
Aomori Sightseeing Guide 

Higashidōri, Aomori
Landforms of Aomori Prefecture
Tourist attractions in Aomori Prefecture
Shiriya